Anodontodora is a genus of beetles in the family Buprestidae, containing the following species:

 Anodontodora aurulans (Obenberger, 1922)
 Anodontodora capicola (Obenberger, 1922)

References

Buprestidae genera